"Fatal Woman" may refer to:

 the concept of the "femme fatale"
 The Fatal Woman, a 1915 Dutch film
 an alternate title for Femme Fatale, a 1991 film
 Norine Fournier Lattimore, professionally known as "Dolores", also referred to as the "Fatal Woman of the London Studios"
 "The Fatal Woman: Three Tales", a 1974 work by John Glassco
 a 1952 novel by Patrick Quentin also published under the title "Black Widow"